The 16209 / 16210 Mysore–Ajmer Express is an Express train belonging to Indian Railways – South Western Railway zone that runs between  and  in India.

It operates as train number 16209 from Ajmer Junction to Mysore Junction and as train number 16210 in the reverse direction, serving the states of Karnataka, Maharashtra, Gujarat & Rajasthan.

Coach composition

The train consists of 23 coaches:

 1 AC 1st Class
 2 AC 2 tier
 2 AC 3 tier
 12 Sleeper Class
 1 Pantry car
 3 Unreserved/General
 2 Seating cum Luggage Rake

As with most train services in India, coach composition may be amended at the discretion of Indian Railways depending on demand.

Service

As the average speed of the train is below , as per Indian Railways rules, its fare does not include a Superfast surcharge.

Routeing

Schedule

Rake sharing

The train shares its rake with 16217/16218 Mysore–Sainagar Shirdi Express.

Traction

As most of the route is yet to be electrified, a Hubli-based WDP-4D locomotive hauls the train for its entire journey.

External links

References 

Transport in Ajmer
Transport in Mysore
Express trains in India
Rail transport in Maharashtra
Rail transport in Gujarat
Rail transport in Rajasthan
Rail transport in Karnataka